Rajesh Banik (born 12 December 1984) is an Indian cricketer who played first-class and List A cricket for Tripura from 2000 to 2018.

In a 50-over match against Orissa in February 2007, Banik scored 101 not out off 103 balls in Tripura's total of 219 for 9.

References

External links

1984 births
Living people
People from Agartala
Indian cricketers
Tripura cricketers